The following is a list of notable events and releases that happened in 2014 in music in the United States.

Events

January
26 – The 56th Annual Grammy Awards, hosted by LL Cool J took place at the Staples Center in Los Angeles, California. Daft Punk won 5 awards, including Album of the Year for Random Access Memories and Record of the Year for "Get Lucky". 
28 – Mötley Crüe signed a "Cessation of Tour" agreement which will see them retire after a final world tour ending in 2015.

February
2 – Soprano Renée Fleming makes history as the first opera singer to perform the National Anthem at the Super Bowl. Bruno Mars performs during the halftime show, with an appearance from the Red Hot Chili Peppers.
4 – Transatlantic release their first album in five years, Kaleidoscope.
25 – As I Lay Dying lead singer Tim Lambesis pleads guilty to felony solicitation of murder after attempting to hire a hitman to kill his estranged ex-wife.
Whole February – Katy Perry tops the US Billboard Hot 100 with her song "Dark Horse", which overtakes Madonna in the most weeks at No. 1, and ties with Janet Jackson.

March
23 – Dave Brockie (also known as Oderus Urungus), lead singer of Gwar, died from an accidental overdose. After his public memorial in August, his character's infamous costume received a Viking funeral at Haddad's Lake in Gwar's hometown of Richmond, Virginia. The band reformed, resumed touring, and began ending their sets with a revised cover of Jim Carroll's punk classic, "People Who Died."
27 – Christine McVie rejoined Fleetwood Mac for first time in sixteen years.

April
1 – Nickel Creek released their first album in nine years, A Dotted Line.
6 - The Academy of Country Music Awards took place in Las Vegas.
10 – The 2014 Rock and Roll Hall of Fame took place. Nirvana, 
Kiss, Peter Gabriel, Hall & Oates, Cat Stevens and Linda Ronstadt were inducted at the ceremony.
22 – Actor and musician Drake Bell released his first album in eight years, Ready Steady Go!.

May
5 – Following the 2014 Met Gala in New York City at an after-party at The Standard, High Line, Solange Knowles attacks Jay-Z by violently punching him in the face followed by kicking and swinging him and even hitting him with her purse. Video footage which was obtained by TMZ was made public on May 12, 2014.
May 13 – Michael Jackson's second posthumous album of previously unreleased tracks, Xscape, was released. Jackson and Justin Timberlake's duet "Love Never Felt So Good" was announced as the official lead single.
17 – Saosin performed at the Skate and Surf festival with their original lead vocalist, Anthony Green (who is also Circa Survive's frontman). This was the first time Green had performed with Saosin since departing in 2004 to form Circa Survive.
20 – Josh Kaufman is crowned winner of the sixth season of The Voice, with Jake Worthington and Christina Grimmie finishing runner-up and third place respectively.
21 – Caleb Johnson is crowned winner of the thirteenth season of American Idol while Jena Irene is named the runner-up.

August
13 – After being with the band for 17 years, guitarist Chris Walla leaves Death Cab for Cutie.
24 – The MTV Video Music Awards took place at the Inglewood Forum in Inglewood, California. Beyoncé wins four awards that night and also received the Michael Jackson Video Vanguard Award, presented to her by her husband Jay Z and her daughter Blue Ivy.

September
2 – Counting Crows released Somewhere Under Wonderland, their first album of original material in six years.
16 – Chris Brown comes back with the release of his sixth studio album, X and for the sixth time makes the top 10.
23 - Lady Gaga and Tony Bennett release their collaborative album, Cheek to Cheek, with them being 28 and 88 years old respectively, it marks the highest age-gap through a collaborative album of 60 years. 
30 – Finch releases Back to Oblivion, their first studio album in nine years, following a series of disbandings and reunions.

October
7 – New Found Glory released Resurrection, their first studio album as a quartet following their firing of guitarist Steve Klein in 2013.
20 – Gwen Stefani releases her comeback single as a solo artist, "Baby Don't Lie".
21 – Slipknot released their first album in six years, .5: The Gray Chapter.
27 – Taylor Swift releases her fifth studio album, 1989, which debuted at number one with 1,287,000 copies sold in its first week. This is the highest debut sales week for an artist since Eminem's 2002 album The Eminem Show and the second highest debut for a female artist, behind Britney Spears' album Oops!... I Did It Again (2000).
28 – Live releases The Turn, their first studio album in eight years and also their only studio album to feature Chris Shinn on lead vocals.

November
1 – Just three days before his 49th birthday, Static-X frontman Wayne Static was found dead in his sleep.
10 – Taylor Swift released "Blank Space", the second single from her successful 1989. "Blank Space" reached number one in November, ending the run of Swift's own "Shake It Off". In doing so, Swift became the first female artist in the history of the Hot 100, and tenth act overall, to replace herself at the top of the chart. With "Shake It Off" and "Blank Space", Swift was also the only artist to notch multiple number-ones in 2014.
23 – The American Music Awards took place in Los Angeles.

December
15 – TLC releases their first single in nine years called "Gift Wrapped Kiss".
16 – Craig Wayne Boyd is crowned winner of the 7th season of The Voice, with Matt McAndrew, Chris Jamison and Damien finishing runner-up, third place and fourth place respectively.

Bands formed
 Antemasque
 American Wrestlers
 Cheat Codes
 FFS
 Maddie & Tae
 No Devotion
 Saint Asonia
 Sheer Mag
 Slaves
 Soul Glo
 You+Me

Bands reformed

American Football
Atreyu
Babes In Toyland
Basement
Breaking Benjamin
Constantines
Copeland
Deep Dish
Despised Icon
Design the Skyline
Erase Errata
Failure
Haste the Day
L7
The Libertines
Luna
The Matches
Metro Station
Midtown
Mineral
The Movielife
Nickel Creek
OutKast
Ride
Saosin
Sleater-Kinney
Slowdive
Trick Pony
The Unicorns

Bands on hiatus
As I Lay Dying
Darkside
Dredg
Foxy Shazam
Furthur
The Wanted
Yeah Yeah Yeahs

Bands disbanded

Abandon All Ships
The Allman Brothers Band
Anberlin
As Blood Runs Black
Austrian Death Machine
Beady Eye
Beastie Boys
Beneath the Sky
The Blackout
Bleeding Through 
Bomb the Music Industry!
Brown Bird
Camp Freddy
Chimaira
The Civil Wars
Clipse
Company of Thieves
Crystal Castles
Danity Kane
The Dangerous Summer
Death Grips
Eleventyseven
For All Those Sleeping
Guided by Voices
The Knife
Lestat
LFO
The Luchagors
Morning Parade
The Move
Nightmare Boyzzz
Nachtmystium
Pink Floyd
The Rapture
Richard Cheese and Lounge Against the Machine
Rob Base and DJ E-Z Rock
Smith Westerns
The Swellers
Ten Second Epic
There for Tomorrow
Vista Chino
Vivian Girls

Albums released

January

February

March

April

May

June

July

August

September

October

November

December

Top songs on record

Billboard Hot 100 No. 1 Songs
 "All About That Bass" – Meghan Trainor  (8 weeks) 
 "All of Me" – John Legend  (3 weeks) 
 "Blank Space" – Taylor Swift  (5 weeks) 
 "Dark Horse" – Katy Perry feat. Juicy J  (4 weeks) 
 "Fancy" – Iggy Azalea feat. Charli XCX  (7 weeks) 
 "Happy" – Pharrell Williams  (10 weeks) 
 "Rude" – MAGIC!  (6 weeks) 
 "Shake It Off" – Taylor Swift  (4 weeks) 
 "The Monster" – Eminem feat. Rihanna (2 weeks in 2014, 2 weeks in 2013)
 "Timber" – Pitbull feat. Kesha (3 weeks)

Billboard Hot 100 Top 20 Hits
All songs that reached the Top 20 on the Billboard Hot 100 chart during the year, complete with peak chart placement.

Deaths

See also
 2010s in music
 2014 in music

References